Urs Bitterli (born 19 May 1944) is a Swiss rower. He competed in the men's coxed pair event at the 1968 Summer Olympics.

References

External links
 

1944 births
Living people
Swiss male rowers
Olympic rowers of Switzerland
Rowers at the 1968 Summer Olympics
Sportspeople from the canton of Solothurn